Balogun Lookman Ayo, known as General Bugantra (born 8 February 1980), is a Nigerian film producer and actor. He participates mainly in the Nollywood movie industry.

Early life 
Bugantra was born and raised in Lagos, Nigeria to the family of Chief & Mrs Balogun. He attended A.D.R.O primary school, Ipaja (1985), Command secondary school, Ipaja and further advanced to study medicine in University of Lagos (UNILAG) in 2001. He found his passion of production and theatre arts while in the university.

Career 
He started Nollywood with a movie in 2018 titled Motigbo( I have heard). Bugantra with a Bachelor in Theatre Arts degree honor from London Film Academy has also produced movies such as Aije Yalemi (2019) & Back to sender (2019).

FIlmography 
Balogun Lukman Ayo has produced In Nollywood movies. Amongst them are:.

 Motigbo (2018)
 Aije Yalemi (2019)
 Back to sender (2019)
 Bone of my bones (2020)
 Boomerang (2020)
 Barbers shop (2020)

References

External links 

Nigerian male film actors
Nigerian film producers
1980 births
Living people
21st-century Nigerian male actors